Hieronymus Wierix (1553–1619) was a Flemish engraver, draughtsman and publisher.  He is known for his reproductive engravings after the work of well-known local and foreign artists including Albrecht Dürer.  Together with other members of the Wierix family of engravers he played an important role in spreading appreciation for Netherlandish art abroad as well as in creating art that supported the Catholic cause in the Southern Netherlands.

Life
Hieronymus Wierix was born in Antwerp as the son of Anton Wierix I (c. 1520/25–c. 1572). His father Anton was registered as a painter in 1545–6 but is occasionally also referred to as a cabinet maker.  It is not believed that Anton I taught Hieronymous or his other two sons Johannes and Anton II.  Hieronymus and Johannes are believed to have trained with a goldsmith while Anton II likely trained with an older brother, probably Johannes. After his father death Hieronymus was placed under the guardianship of Sanson Catsopyn and Jheronimus Mannacker.

His first engraving as independent master dates back to 1577. During the period of 1577–1580, he made a lot of prints for Willem van Haecht the Elder and Godevaard van Haecht. These works of him were mainly allegorical and political, where he reflected his sympathy for those who rebelled against the Spanish.

Listed as Lutherans at the time of the Fall of Antwerp in 1585, the family members seem to have reconverted to Catholicism soon thereafter. The three Wierix brothers gained a reputation for their disorderly conduct as evidenced by a 1587 letter by prominent publisher Christophe Plantin to the Jesuit priest Ferdinand Ximenes in which he complained that whoever wanted to employ the Wierix brothers had to look for them in the taverns, pay their debts and fines and recover their tools, since they would have pawned them.  Plantin also wrote that after having worked for a few days the brothers would return to the tavern.

His apprentices were Abraham van Merlen, Jan Baptist van den Sande the elder, and Jacob de Weert.  His daughter Christina married the engraver Jan Baptist Barbé, who later had his other daughter Cecilia (his sister-in-law) declared insane in order to claim her inheritance, which included a set of Dürer drawings.

Work
Wierix is mostly known for his "very delicate religious prints on a very small scale". In 1570, Wierix worked in master work of Christoph Plantin where he was mastering engraving. He was only seventeen when he made his first engraving for Plantin. He made about 120 engravings for Plantin from 1569 to 1576.

Selected works
Museum Boijmans Van Beuningen
 The Decision to Grow Wheat in a Forest Area for More Profit,  1575 – 1585.
 Portrait of Volcxken Dierckx, 1579
 Saint Ambrose, 1586
 Conservat cuncta Cupido, 1600
 Portrait of Catherine-Henriette de Balzac Dentraigues, Marquise de Verneuil, 1600

National Gallery of Art, Washington
 Fasciculus myrrhae dilectus meus mihi
 Dum pierulo fugendum ...
 O quam tristis et afflicta ..
 S. Lydtwina Virgo Schiedamensis ...

References

External links

1553 births
1619 deaths
16th-century engravers
17th-century engravers
Flemish engravers
Artists from Antwerp